Reg Thomas (6 July 1909 – 5 December 1966) was  a former Australian rules footballer who played with South Melbourne and Footscray in the Victorian Football League (VFL).

Thomas crossed to Williamstown in the VFA in 1938 without a clearance from the Swans where he was captain-coach of the Seconds. Thomas was vice-captain of the 1939 Williamstown premiership side and went on to play 63 games and kick 119 goals with 'Town from 1938 up until the end of 1941, although a broken foot and war-related employment restricted Thomas to just 5 games in his last season. He was awarded the most effective player trophy and best attendance at training in 1938, and was the most improved player in 1940.

Notes

External links 
		

1909 births
1966 deaths
Australian rules footballers from Victoria (Australia)
Sydney Swans players
Western Bulldogs players